A miscarriage of justice occurs when a grossly unfair outcome occurs in a criminal or civil proceeding, such as the conviction and punishment of a person for a crime they did not commit. Miscarriages are also known as wrongful convictions. Innocent people have sometimes ended up in prison for years before their conviction has eventually been overturned. They may be exonerated if new evidence comes to light or it is determined that the police or prosecutor committed some kind of misconduct at the original trial. In some jurisdictions this leads to the payment of compensation.

Academic studies have found that the main factors contributing to miscarriages of justice are: eyewitness misidentification; faulty forensic analysis; false confessions by vulnerable suspects; perjury and lies stated by witnesses; misconduct by police, prosecutors or judges; and/or ineffective assistance of counsel (e.g., inadequate defense strategies by the defendant's or respondent's legal team).

Some prosecutors' offices undertake conviction integrity reviews to prevent, identify, and correct wrongful convictions.

Prevalence
There are two main methods for estimating the prevalence of wrongful convictions.

Exoneration 
The first is the number of exonerations where the guilty verdict has been vacated or annulled by a judge or higher court after new evidence has been brought forward proving the 'guilty' person is, in fact, innocent. Since 1989, the Innocence Project has helped overturn 375 convictions of American prisoners with updated DNA evidence. However, DNA testing occurs in only 5 to 10% of all criminal cases, and exonerations achieved by the Innocence Project are limited to murder and rape cases. This raises the possibility that there may be many more wrongful convictions for which there is no evidence available to exonerate the defendant. Studies cited by the Innocence Project estimate that between 2.3% and 5% of all prisoners in the U.S. are innocent. However, a more recent study looking at convictions in the state of Virginia during the 1970s and 1980s and matching them to later DNA analysis estimates a rate of wrongful conviction at 11.6%.

A 2014 study published in Proceedings of the National Academy of Sciences made a conservative estimate that 4.1% of inmates awaiting execution on death row in the United States are innocent.

Self-report 
The second method for estimating wrongful convictions involves self-report. Researchers ask prisoners whether they have ever confessed to a crime which they did not commit. Self-report allows examination of any and all crimes where wrongful conviction may have occurred, not just murder and rape cases where DNA is available. Two Icelandic studies based on self-report conducted ten years apart found the rates of false confession to be 12.2% and 24.4% respectively. These figures provide a proxy for miscarriages of justice because "false confessions are highly likely to lead to wrongful convictions". A more recent Scottish study found the rate of self-reported false confessions among a group of inmates in one prison was 33.4%.

Another study estimated that up to 10,000 people may be wrongfully convicted of serious crimes in the United States each year. According to Professor Boaz Sangero of the College of Law and Business in Ramat Gan, most wrongful convictions in Israel relate to less serious crimes than major felonies such as rape and murder, as judicial systems are less careful in dealing with those cases.

Contributing factors 
Academics believe that six main factors contribute to miscarriages of justice. These include eyewitness misidentification, faulty forensic analysis, false confessions by vulnerable suspects, perjury and lies told by witnesses, misconduct by police, prosecutors or judges and inadequate defence strategies put forward by the defendant's legal team.

Unreliability of eyewitness testimony 
Eyewitness identifications are notoriously unreliable, contributing to 70% of wrongful convictions. Starting in the 1970s, psychologists studying memory formation and retention found that the way police lineups are conducted can alter an eyewitness's memory of the suspect and this often leads to misidentification. Witnesses also have considerable difficulty making accurate identifications with suspects from different ethnic groups such that "the rate of mistaken identification is significantly higher than most people tend to believe". Elizabeth Loftus, a leading researcher in the field, says memory is so unreliable "the end result can be a highly confident witness testifying in a persuasive manner at trial about a detail that is completely false".

Forensic mistakes

Contamination 
Wrongful convictions can also occur when items which become evidence at crime scenes become contaminated in the process of packaging, collection and transportation to a secured facility or laboratory. Contamination can be introduced unintentionally by material that was not present when the crime was committed by anyone entering the crime scene after the event - by uninvolved witnesses who may become suspects, and by emergency responders, fire fighters, police officers and crime scene investigators themselves. If proper protocols are not followed, evidence can also be contaminated when it is being analyzed or stored. A miscarriage of justice can occur when procedures to prevent contamination are not carried out carefully and accurately.

Faulty analysis 
The Innocence Project says 44% of wrongful convictions are the result of faulty forensic analysis. This occurs when forensic experts inadvertently or deliberately misrepresent the significance, validity or reliability of scientific evidence. Over the years, misrepresentations have been made in the arenas of serological analysis, microscopic hair comparison, and the analysis of bite marks, shoe prints, soil, fiber, and fingerprints.

Overconfident experts 
Overly confident testimony by expert witnesses can also lead to miscarriages of justice. The credibility of expert witnesses depends on numerous factors - in particular, their credentials, personal likability and self-confidence which all impact on how believable they are. The confidence with which experts present their evidence has also been noted to influence jurors, who tend to assume that a witness who is anxious or nervous is lying. The manner in which experts testify may have a greater impact on judges and lawyers who prefer experts who provide clear, unequivocal conclusions.

The credentials and reputation of the expert also have a significant impact on juries. For example, Charles Smith was head of the Ontario Pediatric Forensic Pathology Unit from 1982 and the most highly regarded specialist in his field. His  testimony led to the convictions of thirteen women whose children died in unexplained circumstance before it came to light that he had "a thing against people who hurt children", and "was on a crusade and acted more like a prosecutor" than a pathologist. An inquiry into his conduct concluded in October 2008 that Smith "actively misled" his superiors, "made false and misleading statements" in court and exaggerated his expertise in trials.

False confessions 

The possibility that innocent people would admit to a crime they did not commit seems unlikely - and yet this occurs so often, the Innocence Project found false confessions contribute to approximately 25% of wrongful convictions in murder and rape cases. Certain suspects are more vulnerable to making a false confession under police pressure. This includes individuals who are intellectually impaired, and those who suffer from mental illness. Saul Kassin, a leading expert on false confessions, says that young people are also particularly vulnerable to confessing, especially when stressed, tired, or traumatized.

Coercive interrogation techniques 

Police often use coercive manipulation techniques when conducting interrogations in hopes of obtaining a confession. In the United States, one of these is known as the Reid Technique after the officer who developed it, John Reid. Introduced in the 1940s and 50s, the strategy relies on deception, coercion and aggressive confrontation to secure confessions. It became the leading interrogation method used by law enforcement throughout the United States and has led to many confessions by innocent people. As of 2014, this technique was still popular with police interrogators even though the strategy produces less information from suspects, provides fewer true confessions and more false confessions than less confrontational interviewing techniques.

Perjury and false accusations 
Witnesses in police investigations may lie for a variety of reasons including: personal ill-will towards the defendant, the desire to be paid, the desire to get a deal from prosecutors or police, or an effort to deflect attention from a person’s own involvement in a crime. An innocent person is more likely to be convicted when one or more witnesses have an incentive to testify, and those incentives are not disclosed to the jury. According to the National Registry of Exonerations, 57% of cases where the convicted person was eventually exonerated involves perjury or false accusations.

Prosecutorial misconduct 

This occurs in numerous ways including the concealment or destruction of exculpatory evidence; the failure to disclose exculpatory evidence to the defence; the failure to reveal that certain witnesses have been paid to testify; and the planting of incriminating evidence. An Innocence Project study found that 25% of DNA exonerations involved testimony that was known to be false by the police and another 11% involved the undisclosed use of coerced witness testimony. In other words, over one third of these wrongful convictions involved prosecutorial misconduct.

Role of bias and cognitive distortions 
Confirmation bias is a psychological phenomenon whereby people tend to seek and interpret information in ways that support existing beliefs. Two inter-related mechanisms tend to operate: it begins with a biased interpretation of whatever information is available, followed by selectively searching for information which supports this interpretation. In police investigations, this comes into play when detectives identify a suspect early in an investigation, come to believe he or she is guilty, and then ignore or downplay other evidence that points to someone else or doesn't fit their hypothesis about what occurred.

A number of factors contribute to this process. First, police officers often have heavy workloads and, in high-profile cases, often come under considerable pressure to catch the perpetrator as soon as possible. This may encourage a rush to judgement - in a process described by psychologists as involving a high need for cognitive closure (NFC) - the desire for a clear-cut solution which avoids confusion and ambiguity.

Second, after spending considerable time and resources trying to build a case against a particular suspect, it becomes difficult for police to admit they may be going down the wrong track. The embarrassment and loss of prestige that follows from admitting erroneous decisions may motivate investigators to continue down a chosen path and disregard evidence that points in a different direction.

Third, criminal investigations are generally theory-driven activities. Investigators tend to evaluate evidence based on their preliminary theories or hypotheses about how, and by whom, a crime was committed. Because of the pressures described above, such hypotheses are sometimes based on the expectations and preconceptions of the investigators rather than on solid facts. A study in the Journal of Investigative Psychology and Offender Profiling found that "criminal investigations which aim at generating evidence confirming an ill-founded hypothesis pose serious threats both to the security of innocent citizens and to the effectiveness of the law-enforcement system".

Noble cause corruption 

Police may become convinced a particular suspect is guilty but not have sufficient evidence to prove it. Sometimes they may plant evidence in order to secure a conviction because they believe it is in the public interest, or that there is a greater good, in convicting a particular person. In other words, they believe that the ends (or the outcome) justifies the means. This is known as noble cause corruption.

Plea bargaining 

Another technique used by police is plea bargaining whereby the prosecutor provides a concession to the defendant in exchange for a plea of guilt. This generally occurs when the defendant pleads guilty to a less serious charge, or to one of several charges, in return for the dismissal of the main charge; or it may mean that the defendant pleads guilty to the main charge in return for a more lenient sentence.

Compensation for wrongful conviction 

Article 14(6) of the International Covenant on Civil and Political Rights (ICCPR) states that when a miscarriage of justice has occurred and the defendant's conviction has been reversed or they have been pardoned, "the person who has suffered punishment as a result of such conviction shall be compensated according to law". The right to compensation is also authorised by Article 3 of Protocol No. 7 to the European Convention for the Protection of Human Rights and Fundamental Freedoms and Article 10 of the American Convention on Human Rights.

Four broad approaches allow for the payment of compensation following a miscarriage of justice: tort liability in common law; claims for a breach of constitutional or human rights;  statutory relief where specific legislation exists to compensate individuals who are wrongfully convicted; and non-statutory relief by way of ex-gratia schemes based on the largesse of the government. 

In a study of different approaches to the payment of compensation in the United States, the United Kingdom, Canada, Australia and New Zealand, only the US and the UK have statutory schemes in place. In the United States, the federal government, the District of Columbia, and 38 states have such legislation on their statutes. Twelve states have no laws requiring compensation to be paid. However, each state differs widely in regard to eligibility requirements, maximum payments, issues concerning factual innocence, the burden of proof, the behaviour of the claimant which contributed to the (now overturned) conviction, and the claimant's prior criminal history. In some states, statutes of limitations also applies.

The significant benefits of statutory schemes is that they provide money and services in compensation to individuals who have been wrongfully convicted without regard to fault or blame; they do not require claimants to prove how the prosecution or police committed their mistakes.

Implications
The concept of miscarriage of justice has important implications for standard of review, in that an appellate court will often only exercise its discretion to correct a plain error when a miscarriage of justice (or "manifest injustice") would otherwise occur. In recent years, DNA evidence has been used to clear many people falsely convicted.

The risk of miscarriages of justice is often cited as a cause to eliminate the death penalty. When condemned persons are executed before they are determined to have been wrongly convicted, the effect of that miscarriage of justice is irreversible. Wrongly executed people nevertheless occasionally receive posthumous pardons—which essentially void the conviction—or have their convictions quashed.

Even when a wrongly convicted person is not executed, years in prison can have a substantial, irreversible effect on the person and their family. The risk of miscarriage of justice is therefore also an argument against long sentences, like a life sentence, and cruel prison conditions.

Consequences
Wrongful convictions appear at first to be "rightful" arrests and subsequent convictions, and also include a public statement about a particular crime having occurred, as well as a particular individual or individuals having committed that crime. If the conviction turns out to be a miscarriage of justice, then one or both of these statements is ultimately deemed to be false. In cases where a large-scale audience is unknowingly witness to a miscarriage of justice, the news-consuming public may develop false beliefs about the nature of crime itself. It may also cause the public to falsely believe that certain types of crime exist, or that certain types of people tend to commit these crimes, or that certain crimes are more commonly prevalent than they actually are. Thus, wrongful convictions can ultimately mold a society's popular beliefs about crime. Because our understanding of crime is socially constructed, it has been shaped by many factors other than its actual occurrence.

Mass media may also be faulted for distorting the public perception of crime by over-representing certain races and genders as criminals and victims, and for highlighting more sensational and invigorating types of crimes as being more newsworthy. The way a media presents crime-related issues may have an influence not only on a society's fear of crime but also on its beliefs about the causes of criminal behavior and desirability of one or another approach to crime control. Ultimately, this may have a significant impact on critical public beliefs about emerging forms of crime such as cybercrime, global crime, and terrorism.

Some wrongfully sanctioned people join organizations like the Innocence Project and Witness to Innocence to publicly share their stories, as a way to counteract these media distortions and to advocate for various types of criminal justice reform.

There are unfavorable psychological effects to those who were wrongfully sanctioned, even in the absence of any public knowledge. In an experiment, participants significantly reduced their pro-social behavior after being wrongfully sanctioned. As a consequence there were negative effects for the entire group. The extent of wrongful sanctions varies between societies.

When a crime occurs and the wrong person is convicted for it, the actual perpetrator goes free and often goes on to commit additional crimes, including hundreds of cases of violent crime. A 2019 study estimated that "the wrong‐person wrongful convictions that occur annually [in the United States] may lead to more than 41,000 additional crimes".

By country

Canada
A series of miscarriages of justice in Canada have led to reforms of the country's criminal justice system. In 1972, Donald Marshall, Jr., a Mi'kmaq man, was wrongly convicted of murder. Marshall spent 11 years in jail before being acquitted in 1983. The case led to questions about the fairness of the Canadian justice system, especially given that Marshall was an Aboriginal: as the Canadian Broadcasting Corporation put it, "The name Donald Marshall is almost synonymous with 'wrongful conviction' and the fight for native justice in Canada." Marshall received a lifetime pension of $1.5 million in compensation and his conviction resulted in changes to the Canada Evidence Act so that any evidence obtained by the prosecution must be presented to the defence on disclosure. 

In 1992, Guy Paul Morin was convicted of the 1984 rape and murder of an 8-year-old girl and was sentenced to life imprisonment. In 1995, new testing of DNA evidence showed Morin could not have been the murderer, and the Ontario Court of Appeal overturned his conviction. The case has been described as "a compendium of official error — from inaccurate eyewitness testimony and police tunnel vision, to scientific bungling and the suppression of evidence."  Morin received $1.25 million in compensation from the Ontario government.

China
A series of wrongful convictions uncovered in the 2010s has undermined public trust in the Chinese justice system.

Netherlands
In response to two overturned cases, the Schiedammerpark murder case and the Putten murder, the Netherlands created the "Posthumus I committee" which analyzed what had gone wrong in the Schiedammerpark murder case. The committee concluded that confirmation bias led the police to ignore and misinterpret scientific evidence, specifically DNA. Subsequently, the Posthumus II committee investigated whether injustice occurred in similar cases. The committee received 25 applications from concerned and involved scientists and selected three for further investigation: the Lucia de Berk case, the Ina Post case, and the Enschede incest case. In those three cases, independent researchers (professors Wagenaar, van Koppen, Israëls, Crombag, and Derksen) concluded that confirmation bias and misuse of complex scientific evidence led to miscarriages of justice.

Spain
The Constitution of Spain guarantees compensation in cases of miscarriage of justice.

United Kingdom
In the United Kingdom a jailed person, whose conviction is quashed, might be paid compensation for the time they were incarcerated. This is currently limited by statute to a maximum sum of £1,000,000 for those who have been incarcerated for more than ten years and £500,000 for any other cases, with deductions for the cost of food and prison cell during that time. See also Overturned convictions in the United Kingdom.

Richard Foster, the Chairman of the Criminal Cases Review Commission (CCRC), reported in October 2018 that the single biggest cause of miscarriage of justice was the failure to disclose vital evidence.

A major factor leading to the abolition of capital punishment for murder in the United Kingdom was the case of Timothy Evans, who was executed in 1950 after being wrongfully convicted of a murder that had in fact been committed by his neighbour.

England, Wales and Northern Ireland

Until 2005, the parole system assumed all convicted persons were guilty, and poorly handled those who were not. To be paroled, a convicted person had to sign a document in which, among other things, they confessed to the crime for which they were convicted. Someone who refused to sign this declaration spent longer in jail than someone who signed it. Some wrongly convicted people, such as the Birmingham Six, were refused parole for this reason. In 2005 the system changed, and began to parole prisoners who never admitted guilt.

English law has no official means of correcting a "perverse" verdict (conviction of a defendant on the basis of insufficient evidence). Appeals are based exclusively on new evidence or errors by the judge or prosecution (but not the defence), or jury irregularities. A reversal occurred, however, in the 1930s when William Herbert Wallace was exonerated of the murder of his wife. There is no right to a trial without jury (except during the troubles in Northern Ireland or in the case where there is a significant risk of jury-tampering, such as organised crime cases, when a judge or judges presided without a jury).

During the early 1990s, a series of high-profile cases turned out to be miscarriages of justice. Many resulted from police fabricating evidence to convict people they thought were guilty, or simply to get a high conviction rate. The West Midlands Serious Crime Squad became notorious for such practices, and was disbanded in 1989. In 1997 the Criminal Cases Review Commission was established specifically to examine possible miscarriages of justice. However, it still requires either strong new evidence of innocence, or new proof of a legal error by the judge or prosecution. For example, merely insisting on one's innocence, asserting the jury made an error, or stating there was not enough evidence to prove guilt, is not enough. It is not possible to question the jury's decision or query on what matters it was based. The waiting list for cases to be considered for review is at least two years on average.

In 2002, the Northern Ireland Court of Appeal made an exception to who could avail of the right to a fair trial in R v Walsh: "... if a defendant has been denied a fair trial it will almost be inevitable that the conviction will be regarded unsafe, the present case in our view constitutes an exception to the general rule. ... the conviction is to be regarded as safe, even if a breach of Article 6(1) were held to have occurred in the present case." (See Christy Walsh (Case).)

Scotland
The Criminal Appeal (Scotland) Act 1927 increased the jurisdiction of the Scottish Court of Criminal Appeal following the miscarriage of justice surrounding the Trial of Oscar Slater.

Reflecting Scotland's own legal system, which differs from that of the rest of the United Kingdom, the Scottish Criminal Cases Review Commission (SCCRC) was established in April 1999. All cases accepted by the SCCRC are subjected to a robust and thoroughly impartial review before a decision on whether or not to refer to the High Court of Justiciary is taken.

United States

In June 2012, the National Registry of Exonerations, a joint project of the University of Michigan Law School and Northwestern University Pritzker School of Law, initially reported 873 individual exonerations in the U.S. from January 1989 through February 2012; the report called this number "tiny" in a country with 2.3 million people in prisons and jails, but asserted that there are far more false convictions than exonerations. By 2015, the number of individual exonerations was reported as 1,733, with 2015 having the highest annual number of exonerations since 1989. By 2019, the number had risen to 1,934 individuals. 20 individuals have been exonerated while on death row due to DNA evidence.

According to a 2020 report by the National Registry of Exonerations, official misconduct contributed to 54% of all wrong convictions. The study only counted misconduct when it directly contributed to the convictions, such as the generation of false evidence or concealment of evidence of innocence.

At least 21 states in the U.S. do not offer compensation for wrongful imprisonment.

The Innocence Project works to exonerate people in the United States who have been wrongfully convicted of crime. It has estimated that 1 percent of all U.S. prisoners are innocent. With the number of incarcerated Americans being approximately 2.4 million, by that estimate as many as 20,000 people may be incarcerated as a result of wrongful conviction.

Research into the issue of wrongful convictions have led to the use of methods to avoid wrongful convictions, such as double-blind eyewitness identification. Leading causes of wrongful convictions in the United States include snitches and unscientific forensics.
Other causes include police and prosecutorial misconduct.

African Americans make up 13.6% of the U.S. population, but 53% of exonerations, as of August 2022.

See also

 Alford plea
 Error of impunity
 False accusations
 False allegation of child sexual abuse
 False confession
 Innocent prisoner's dilemma
 Legal abuse
 Perverting the course of justice
 Police misconduct
 Presumption of guilt

Specific cases
 List of miscarriage of justice cases
 List of wrongful convictions in the United States
 List of exonerated death row inmates

Notes and references

Further reading
 
 Jed S. Rakoff, "Jailed by Bad Science", The New York Review of Books, vol. LXVI, no. 20 (19 December 2019), pp. 79–80, 85. According to Judge Rakoff (p. 85), "forensic techniques that in their origin were simply viewed as aids to police investigations have taken on an importance in the criminal justice system that they frequently cannot support. Their results are portrayed... as possessing a degree of validity and reliability that they simply do not have." Rakoff commends (p. 85) the U.S. National Academy of Sciences recommendation to "creat[e] an independent National Institute of Forensic Science to do the basic testing and promulgate the basic standards that would make forensic science much more genuinely scientific."

External links
 

Justice
Legal error
Human rights
Abuse of the legal system